The 2020 McNeese State Cowboys football team represented the McNeese State University in the 2020–21 NCAA Division I FCS football season. The Cowboys played their home games at Cowboy Stadium in Lake Charles, Louisiana and competed in the Southland Conference. They were led by first-year head coach Frank Wilson.

On August 13, McNeese State Athletic Department decided to postpone all fall sports with the intent to play in the spring.  This decision canceled all games that were to be played from September through November 2020.

Previous season
The Cowboys finished the 2019 season 7–5, 5–4 in Southland play to finish in the Southland Conference. Following the season, first-year head coach Sterlin Gilbert resigned following the mediocre season.

Preseason

Recruiting class
Reference(s):

|}

Preseason poll
The Southland Conference released their spring preseason poll in January 2021. The Cowboys were picked to finish fourth in the conference. In addition, three Bearkats were chosen to the Preseason All-Southland Team

Preseason All–Southland Teams

Offense

1st Team
Cyron Sutton – Wide Receiver, SR

Defense

1st Team
Darion Dunn – Defensive Back, SR

2nd Team
Cory McCoy – Defensive Back, SR
Cyron Sutton – Punt Returner, SR

Roster

Schedule

Game summaries

at Tarleton State

Incarnate Word

at Southeastern Louisiana

Lamar

at Northwestern State

Nicholls

at Sam Houston State

References

McNeese State
McNeese Cowboys football seasons
McNeese State Cowboys football